No Exit is a 1944 existentialist French play by Jean-Paul Sartre. The play was first performed at the Théâtre du Vieux-Colombier in May 1944. The play begins with three characters who find themselves waiting in a mysterious room. It is a depiction of the afterlife in which three deceased characters are punished by being locked into a room together for eternity. It is the source of Sartre's especially famous phrase "L'enfer, c'est les autres" or "Hell is other people", a reference to Sartre's ideas about the look and the perpetual ontological struggle of being caused to see oneself as an object from the view of another consciousness.

English translations have also been performed under the titles  In Camera, No Way Out, Vicious Circle, Behind Closed Doors, and Dead End. The original title, Huis clos ("closed door"), is the French equivalent of the legal term in camera (Latin: "in a chamber"), referring to a private discussion behind closed doors.

Plot
Three damned souls, Joseph Garcin, Inèz Serrano, and Estelle Rigault, are brought to the same room in Hell and locked inside by a mysterious valet. They had all expected torture devices to punish them for eternity, but instead, find a plain room furnished in the style of the French 'Second Empire'. At first, none of them will admit the reason for their damnation: Garcin says that he was executed for being an outspoken pacifist, while Estelle insists that a mistake has been made; Inèz, however, is the only one to demand that they all stop lying to themselves and confess to their moral crimes. She refuses to believe that they have all ended up in the room by accident and soon realizes that they have been placed together to make each other miserable. She deduces that they are to be one another's torturers.

Garcin suggests that they try to leave each other alone and to be silent, but Inèz starts to sing about execution and Estelle vainly wants to find a mirror to check on her appearance. Inèz tries to seduce Estelle by offering to be her "mirror" by telling her everything she sees but ends up frightening her instead. It is soon clear that Inèz is attracted to Estelle, Estelle is attracted to Garcin, and Garcin is not attracted to either of the two women.

After arguing, they decide to confess to their crimes so they know what to expect from each other. Garcin cheated on and mistreated his wife, and was executed by firing squad for desertion; Inèz is a manipulative sadist who seduced her cousin's wife, Florence, while living with them and convinced her to leave her husband—the cousin was later hit and killed by a tram and Florence asphyxiated herself and Inèz by flooding the room with gas while they slept—and Estelle had an affair and then killed the resulting child, prompting the child's father to commit suicide. Despite their revelations, they continue to get on each other's nerves. Garcin finally begins giving in to the lascivious Estelle's escalating attempts to seduce him, which drives Inèz crazy. Garcin is constantly interrupted by his own guilt, however, and begs Estelle to tell him that he is not a coward for attempting to flee his country during wartime. While she complies, Inèz mockingly tells him that Estelle is just feigning attraction to him so that she can be with a man—any man.

This causes Garcin to abruptly attempt an escape. After his trying to open the door repeatedly, it inexplicably and suddenly opens, but he is unable to bring himself to leave, and the others remain as well. He says that he will not be saved until he can convince Inèz that he is not cowardly. She refuses, saying that he is obviously a coward, and promising to make him miserable forever. Garcin concludes that rather than torture devices or physical punishment, "hell is other people." Estelle tries to persevere in her seduction of Garcin, but he says that he cannot make love while Inèz is watching. Estelle, infuriated, picks up a paper knife and repeatedly stabs Inèz. Inèz chides Estelle, saying that they are all already dead, and even furiously stabs herself to prove that point. As Estelle begins to laugh hysterically at the idea of them being dead and trapped together forever, the others join in a prolonged fit of laughter before Garcin finally concludes, "Eh bien, continuons..." ("Well then, let's get on with it...").

Characters
Joseph Garcin – He is a journalist who lived in the barracks in Rio and died after refusing to fight in an unnamed war. His cowardice and callousness caused his young wife to die "of grief" after his execution. He was unfaithful to his wife – he even recalls, without any sympathy, bringing home another woman one night, and his wife bringing them their morning coffee after hearing their engagement all night. Initially, he hates Inèz because she understands his weakness, and wants Estelle because he feels that if she treats him as a man he will become manly. However, by the end of the play he understands that because Inèz understands the meaning of cowardice and wickedness, only absolution at her hands can redeem him (if indeed redemption is possible). In a later translation and adaptation of the play by American translator Paul Bowles, Garcin is renamed Vincent Cradeau.

Inèz Serrano – Inèz is the second character to enter the room. A lesbian postal clerk, she turned a wife against her husband, twisting the wife's perception of her spouse and the subsequent death of the man who is also her cousin. Inèz seems to be the only character who understands the power of opinion, manipulating Estelle's and Garcin's opinions of themselves and of each other throughout the play. She is honest about the evil deeds she, Garcin, and Estelle have done. She frankly acknowledges the fact that she is a cruel person.

Estelle Rigault – Estelle is a high-society woman, who married an older man for his money and had an affair with a younger man. To her, the affair is merely an insignificant fling, but her lover becomes emotionally attached to her and she bears him a child. She drowns the child by throwing it off the balcony of a hotel into the sea, which drives her lover to commit suicide. Throughout the play she tries to get at Garcin, seeking to define herself as a woman in relation to a man. Her sins are deceit and murder (which also motivated a suicide). She lusts over "manly men", which Garcin himself strives to be.

Valet – The Valet enters the room with each character, but his only real dialogue is with Garcin. We learn little about him, except that his uncle is the head valet, and that he does not have any eyelids, which links to Garcin because Garcin's eyelids are atrophied.

Critical reception
The play was widely praised when it was first performed. Upon its 1946 American premiere at the Biltmore Theatre, critic Stark Young described the play as "a phenomenon of the modern theatre – played all over the continent already", in The New Republic, and wrote that "It should be seen whether you like it or not."

Adaptations

Audio
 In 1946, the BBC broadcast a production with Alec Guinness as Garcin, Donald Pleasence as the Valet, Betty Ann Davies as Estelle and Beatrix Lehmann as Inèz, all of whom starred in the first London stage production (see below). The translation was by Margery Gerbain and Joan Swinstead.
 Riverside Records released a 2-LP recording of the Paul Bowles translation in 1961 (RLP 7004/5) with Douglas Watson as Garcin/Cradeau, Nancy Wickwire as Inèz and Betty Field as Estelle.
 In 1968, Caedmon Records released a 2-LP recording of the Paul Bowles translation directed by Howard Sackler (TRS 327), with Donald Pleasence as Garcin/Cradeau, Glenda Jackson as Inèz and Anna Massey as Estelle.

Film 
 Huis clos (1954), directed by Jacqueline Audry
 No Exit (1962), directed by Tad Danielewski

Television
 In 1964 the BBC broadcast an adaptation with Harold Pinter as Garcin broadcast as part of its The Wednesday Play anthology series. It was adapted and directed by Philip Saville.
 In a 2019 episode of Mr. Robot, Mr. Robot showed off a "No Exit” book while the main protagonist was trapped in a “honeypot” in a Manhattan apartment.

Theatre
 The play first premiered in Paris, France 1944 at the Théâtre du Vieux-Colombier, starring Gaby Silvia  as Estelle, Tania Balachova (who was the ex-wife of director Raymond Rouleau) as Inez, and Michel Vitold as Garcin.
 The first Broadway stage production, using the Paul Bowles translation, ran for three weeks in 1946 at the Biltmore Theatre and starred Claude Dauphin as Garcin, Peter Kass as the Bellboy, Ruth Ford as Estelle and Annabella as Inèz. The production was directed by John Huston.
 The first stage production in London was performed in 1946 under the title Vicious Circle at the Arts Theatre Club and starred Alec Guinness as Garcin, Donald Pleasence as the Valet, Betty Ann Davies as Estelle and Beatrix Lehmann as Inèz. The production was directed by Peter Brook and the translation was by Margery Gerbain and Joan Swinstead.
 In 2018, after raising £4558 through Kickstarter, a "Snowden"-inspired adaptation premiered at Drill Hall in Edinburgh and the Fringe.

Opera
A one-act chamber opera based on the play was created by composer Andy Vores. The production had its world premiere on April 25, 2008, at the Boston Conservatory’s Zack Theatre. Vores' opera premiered in Chicago in October 2009 by Chicago Opera Vanguard.

Parodies
Talk Show from Hell, a modern parody by Jean-Noel Fenwick, was produced by the Open Fist Theatre in Los Angeles, California, in 2000. Mike Schur has compared his show The Good Place, which involves a demon trying to design a novel type of hell in which the inhabitants create one another's torments, to Sartre's play.

References

External links

 No Exit Script
 No Exit at Sparknotes.com
 
 No Exit at A.R.T. 2006 production of No Exit at the American Repertory Theater
 

1944 plays
Existentialist plays
LGBT-related plays
Plays by Jean-Paul Sartre
Plays set in hell
One-act plays
French plays adapted into films
Plays adapted into operas